Manor Hospital my refer to:

 Manor Hospital, Epsom
 Acland Hospital, Oxford
 Walsall Manor Hospital